Waser is a quarter in the district 3 of Winterthur, Switzerland.

Waser may also refer to:
Anna Waser (1678–1714), Swiss painter
Hedwig Bleuler-Waser (1869−1940), founder of the Swiss Federation of Abstinent Women
Hugo Waser (born 1936), Swiss Olympic rower
Johann Heinrich Waser (1600–1669), a mayor of Zürich, Switzerland
Stephan Waser (1920–1992), Swiss Olympic bobsledder